This article lists the heads of state of Iran since the establishment of the modern Iranian nation-state in 1501 AD.

Heads of State of Iran

Graphical timeline of overlaps

See also 

 List of monarchs of Persia
 List of premiers of Iran (1699–1907)
 List of prime ministers of Iran
 List of presidents of Iran

Notes

References

Bibliography

External links 
 World StatesmenIran

Heads of State
Iran
Heads of State